Cyclostrema pompholyx is a species of sea snail, a marine gastropod mollusk in the family Liotiidae.

Description
(Original description by W.H. Dall) The maximum diameter of the base is 4.2 mm; the minimum diameter 3.0 mm. The height of the shell attains 3.0 mm. The white, thin and polished shell contains three rounded, rapidly enlarging whorls. The sculpture consists of incremental striae. The suture is deep but not channelled. The whorls are very round, but the spire is hardly rising above the body whorl. The base of the shell is rounded, with a very narrow umbilicus, into which the whorl descends without any angle or other change of curve. The large aperture is circular, the upper part a little angulated at the suture. The simple margin is sharp and somewhat expanded but hardly reflected.

Distribution
This species occurs in the Gulf of Mexico.

References

 Rosenberg, G., F. Moretzsohn, and E. F. García. 2009. Gastropoda (Mollusca) of the Gulf of Mexico, Pp. 579–699 in Felder, D.L. and D.K. Camp (eds.), Gulf of Mexico–Origins, Waters, and Biota. Biodiversity. Texas A&M Press, College Station, Texas.

pompholyx
Gastropods described in 1889